Herman Schurch (April 7, 1903 in Sumiswald, Switzerland – November 10, 1931 Los Angeles) was a Swiss-American racecar driver. His family  emigrated to the United States when he was a boy. He made five starts in AAA Championship Car from 1929 to 1931. He had failed to qualify for the 1928 Indianapolis 500 but made the race in 1929. He served as a relief driver for Shorty Cantlon in the 1930 race. He also drove in the 1931 Indianapolis 500 but his transmission failed after 5 laps. His best finish in AAA Championship racing came later that year at the New York State Fairgrounds Raceway where he finished sixth. Schurch excelled in Big Car racing (Sprint Car), where he won many races on the Eastern circuit (in the Northeast United States).  He was killed in practice for a dirt track race at Legion Ascot Speedway in California.  Schurch was elected to the National Sprint Car Hall of Fame in 2010.

Indianapolis 500 results

References

1903 births
1931 deaths
American racing drivers
Swiss racing drivers
Indianapolis 500 drivers
Racing drivers who died while racing
Sports deaths in California
National Sprint Car Hall of Fame inductees
Swiss emigrants to the United States